Frothar of Toul was bishop of Toul from around 813 to his death in 847. He is known mainly for his surviving collection of letters. Before becoming bishop, he was abbot of St. Evre's Abbey, Toul.

He undertook work for Louis the Pious, both in dispute resolution, and architectural, at the palace at Gondreville.

Sources
Michel Parisse (1998), La correspondance d'un eveque carolingien: Frothaire de Toul (ca 813-847), avec les lettres de Theuthilde, abbesse de Remiremont

References

847 deaths
French Benedictines
Bishops of Toul
9th-century Latin writers
Writers from the Carolingian Empire
Year of birth unknown
Bishops in the Carolingian Empire
French abbots
Benedictine abbots